The Damndest Radical: The Life and World of Ben Reitman is a 1987 biography of Ben Reitman by Roger Bruns.

References 

 
 
 
 
 

1987 non-fiction books
English-language books
Biographies about anarchists
University of Illinois Press books